Ellis Nagar is a neighbourhood in Madurai district of Tamil Nadu state in the peninsular India. It is named after Francis Whyte Ellis (who lived in between the years 1777 and 1819), a British civil servant in the Madras Presidency, from 1810 to 1819, who translated and printed the first 13 chapters of Tirukurkal's Arathuppal in English.

Madurai, Arappalayam, Koodal Nagar, Vilangudi, Thathaneri, S. S. Colony, Jaihindpuram, Arasaradi, Kalavasal, Simmakkal, South Gate and Yanaikkal are some of the important neighbourhoods of Ellis Nagar.

Ellis Nagar area falls under the Madurai Central Assembly constituency. The winner of the election held in the year 2021 as the member of its assembly constituency is P. T. R. Palanivel Thiagarajan. Also, this area belongs to Madurai Lok Sabha constituency. The winner of the election held in the year 2019, as the member of its Lok Sabha constituency is S. Venkatesan.

References

External links 
 GeoHack - Ellis Nagar

Neighbourhoods and suburbs of Madurai